Elections to the Second Punjab Legislative Assembly were held in 1957. 661 candidates contested for the 154 seats of the 121 constituencies in the Assembly. There were 21 two-member constituencies and 84 single-member constituencies.

State Reorganization
On 1 November 1956, under States Reorganisation Act, 1956, Patiala & East Punjab States Union was merged with Punjab. Thus the assembly constituencies were increased from 105 with 126 seats in 1952 to 121 with 154 seats in 1957 elections.

Constituencies
After the States Reorganisation Act, 1956, the assembly constituencies were increased from 105 with 126 seats in 1952 to 121 with 154 seats in 1957 elections. 88 constituencies were single member constituencies while 33 were two-member constituencies. Out of 121 constituencies, 33 were reserved for Scheduled Tribes. There were 52,44,907 electors in single member constituencies, while 3,96,40,19 in two-member constituencies. Total 661 candidates were in fray for these 154 seats.

Political Parties

Four national parties, Communist Party of India, Congress, Praja Socialist Party and Bharatiya Jana Sangha along with the state party Scheduled Caste Federation took part in the assembly election. Congress was the clear winner in the elections winning 77.92% of the total seats (i.~e. 120 seats) with a vote share of 47.51%. Partap Singh Kairon from the Congress party became the Chief Minister again.

Results

!colspan=10|
|- style="background-color:#E9E9E9; text-align:center;"
! class="unsortable" |
! Political Party !! Flag !! Seats  Contested !! Won !! Net Change  in seats !! % of  Seats
! Votes !! Vote % !! Change in vote %
|- style="background: #90EE90;"
| 
| style="text-align:left;" |Indian National Congress
| 
| 154 || 120 ||  24 || 77.92 || 36,12,709 || 47.51 ||  10.82
|-
| 
| style="text-align:left;" |Communist Party of India
| 
| 72 || 6 ||  2 || 3.90 || 10,30,898 || 13.56 ||  9.67
|-
| 
| style="text-align:left;" |Bharatiya Jana Sangh
|
| 72 || 9 ||  9 || 5.84 || 6,54,395 || 8.61 ||  3.05
|-
|bgcolor=#00FFFF|
| style="text-align:left;" |Scheduled Caste Federation
|
| 24 || 5 ||  5 || 3.25 || 4,10,364 || 5.40 ||  3.43
|-
|bgcolor=#00B2B2|
| style="text-align:left;" |Praja Socialist Party
|
| 19 || 1 || New || 0.65 || 94,564 || 1.24 || New
|-
| 
|
| 319 || 13 ||  4 || 8.44 || 18,00,960 || 23.69 || N/A
|- class="unsortable" style="background-color:#E9E9E9"
! colspan = 3|
! style="text-align:center;" |Total Seats !! 154 ( 28) !! style="text-align:center;" |Voters !! 1,31,72,945 !! style="text-align:center;" |Turnout !! colspan = 2|76,03,890 (57.72%)
|}

Elected members

See also

 1957 elections in India
 1952 Punjab Legislative Assembly election

References

Punjab
1957
1957